Now That's What I Call Music! 31 may refer to two different Now That's What I Call Music! series albums.
 Now That's What I Call Music! 31 (UK series), released on  31 July 1995
 Now That's What I Call Music! 31 (U.S. series), released on 30 June 2009